Fredrikstad bys historie is a six-volume book series on the history of the Norwegian town Fredrikstad. The first five volumes were written by Martin Dehli, whilst the sixth was written by Ivo de Figueiredo.

References

Norwegian books
Fredrikstad